Xylota sibirica is a species of hoverfly in the family Syrphidae.

Distribution
Russia.

References

Eristalinae
Insects described in 1871
Diptera of Asia
Taxa named by Hermann Loew